Nanango is an electoral division in the state of Queensland, Australia. Notable towns include Nanango, Kingaroy and Crows Nest. It is currently held by former Opposition Leader Deb Frecklington of the Liberal National Party.

It has existed twice.  It was first created in 1912, and was replaced by Barambah in 1950.  It was recreated in 2001, as a replacement for Barambah.

Nanango was the original seat of Sir Joh Bjelke-Petersen (from 1947 to 1950).

The seat has never been won by the Labor Party in either of its incarnations; indeed, counting its history as Barambah (which covered essentially the same area), it has been in the hands of a conservative party or a conservative independent for over a century.

Members for Nanango

Election results

References

External links
 

Nanango